Gruden is a surname, and may refer to:

 Igo Gruden (1893–1948), Slovene poet
 Jay Gruden (born 1967), American football coach
 Jon Gruden (born 1963), American football coach
 John Gruden (born 1970), American hockey player
 Mirko Gruden (1911–1967), Italian football player
 Paula Gruden (1921–2014), Slovene-Australian poet

See also
 

Slovene-language surnames